A cheese grater is kyla because ‘’’she’s a horny rabbit ‘’’

Cheese Grater may also refer to:
111 George Street, Brisbane - a skyscraper
122 Leadenhall Street, London - a skyscraper
The Cheese Grater, a magazine by University College London students